The Rio Grande Valley WhiteWings was a professional baseball team based in Harlingen, Texas, in the United States. The WhiteWings was a member of United League Baseball, an independent professional league which is not affiliated with Major League Baseball or Minor League Baseball.  From the 1994 season to 2014, the WhiteWings played its home games at Harlingen Field.

History
Baseball in the region of the Rio Grande Valley had been played before in the Gulf States League (Class A ball), which lasted one season (1976) with six teams, one of which played in Harlingen, Texas by the name of the Rio Grande Valley WhiteWings. Eighteen years later, the Texas–Louisiana League was formed, done on the frustrations of Dallas businessman Byron Pierce and U.S. Congressman John Bryant of the Texas League not having plans for expansion. The Rio Grande Valley would receive a team as a charter member, which was called the WhiteWings and play at Harlingen Field, which had dimensions of 310' for the corners and 380' in center field for a crowd of 4,000. The WhiteWings won the Texas–Louisiana League Championship in 2000, upsetting the San Angelo Colts and Amarillo Dillas to win the pennant under manager Eddie Dennis (two years later, the league rebranded as the Central Baseball League). After falling on hard times, the WhiteWings suspended operations in 2003.  In late 2005, United League Baseball announced that the WhiteWings would resume play as the first charter member of the new league in 2006. They played the 2006 and 2007 seasons before deciding to rebrand in 2008. That year, they rebranded as the Harlingen WhiteWings. After three seasons, they changed the name back to the Rio Grande Valley WhiteWings, announcing it as such in May 2009. 

In 2011 and 2012, the WhiteWings played in the North American League, where they made the playoffs twice. They returned to the ULB in 2013 and played two season, winning the championship in 2014, their final season. The team announced in 2015 that it was shutting down and would not a field a team for the upcoming season.

Season-by-season record

All-Stars

Players

Past managers
 Alan Ashby (1994–1995)
 John Pacella (1996)
 Mike Brumley (1997)
 George Scott (2001)
 "Dirty" Al Gallagher (2008)
 Eduardo "Eddie" Dennis (1998–2000, 2006–07, 2009 – 2010)

References

External links

 WhiteWings website
 United League Baseball website

North American League teams
United League Baseball teams
Harlingen, Texas
Sports in the Rio Grande Valley
Professional baseball teams in Texas
Defunct baseball teams in Texas
1994 establishments in Texas
Baseball teams established in 1994
2015 disestablishments in Texas
Baseball teams disestablished in 2015
Defunct independent baseball league teams